The Thailand Open (also known as PTT Pattaya Open) was a women's tennis tournament held in Pattaya, Thailand. Held since 1991, this WTA Tour event was classified as an International Series tournament and was played on hardcourts.

The event was part of the WTA Tier V series from 1991 to 1992 and then again from 2001 to 2003. It was a Tier IV event from 1993 to 2000 and was promoted back to Tier IV in 2005, after a year's hiatus.  Starting in 2009, the tournament became an International Series event. The 2015 PTT Thailand Open was the last edition.

Daniela Hantuchová holds the record for the most singles titles won with three: 2011, a successful title defence in 2012, and 2015.

Past finals

Singles

Doubles

See also
 Thailand Open (ATP) – men's tournament
 List of tennis tournaments

External links
 

 
1991 establishments in Thailand
2015 disestablishments in Thailand
Tennis
WTA Tour
Hard court tennis tournaments
February sporting events
Recurring sporting events established in 1991
Recurring events disestablished in 2015
Tennis
Tennis tournaments in Thailand
Defunct tennis tournaments in Thailand